One Energy Enterprises, doing business as One Energy, is a private American utility-scale distributed-generation wind energy developer and operator headquartered in Findlay, Ohio. Having installed 7.5 MW of wind in 2015, One Energy was responsible for approximately 30% of all distributed wind energy installed in the United States in 2015.

History 
One Energy was founded in 2009 in Marshall, Minnesota.  In 2011, the company moved its office to Findlay, Ohio, where it installed a project for Cooper Farms in Van Wert, Ohio. Since then, One Energy has continued to develop projects consisting of typically 1-3 wind turbines (each 1.5  MW) of on-site wind energy for industrial energy users.

Other companies under One Energy include One Energy Solutions LLC, One Energy Capital LLC, and One Energy Capital Corporation. The company's customers include Fortune 500 companies. In 2014, the company began its "Megawatt Scholarship" program, which offers a $5,000 scholarship per turbine per year to local high school graduates pursuing a degree in a STEM field. In August 2017, Goldwind Americas signed a deal with One Energy to deliver up to 60 MW worth of turbine parts, which One Energy stocks at the North Findlay Wind Campus to be used for lower lead time with future projects.

Products and Services

Wind for Industry
The company's main service, named Wind for Industry, describes wind energy projects in which utility-scale wind turbines are installed on-site and interconnected on a facility's side of their utility meter (a process known as distributed generation or behind-the-meter wind, which sometimes follows net metering). These projects are designed to achieve a significant reduction of an industrial facility's electrical consumption from the grid.

Capabilities 
One Energy is a vertically integrated company, capable of financing, developing, engineering, procuring for, constructing, and operating projects. The company completes conceptual engineering in-house, referring to third-party engineers for quality control. Due Diligence conducted in-house includes financial projections and modeling, custom studies, management of permitting and utilities, as well as wind mapping and analysis.

One Energy typically offers companies a Power purchase agreement (PPA), which allows customers to pay a fixed rate for the energy produced by the project for the 20-year duration of production. With the PPA financial method, One Energy covers capital expenditure for the project. Alternatively, customers may choose to purchase the turbines upfront, supplying capital expenditure themselves. Renewable Energy Credits (RECs) can also be involved. Proprietary software tools created by the company are used to execute studies regarding sound, microwave, shadow flicker, ice throw, and wake interference for potential turbine sites. One Energy obtains land and FAA permits on behalf of their clients, permits utility interconnection, and serves as a liaison between customers and local authorities.

References

External links 

 Official website
Megawatt Scholarships

One Energy Enterprises LLC
American companies established in 2009
2009 establishments in Ohio
Findlay, Ohio